Sefid Khaneh (also Romanized as Sefīd Khāneh; also known as Safīd Khānī, Safīd Kohni, Isbīkhāni, and Sefīd Khānī) is a village in Gamasiyab Rural District, in the Central District of Nahavand County, Hamadan Province, Iran. At the 2006 census, its population was 747, in 207 families.

References 

Populated places in Nahavand County